Notoxus murinipennis is a species of monoceros beetle in the family Anthicidae. It is found in Central America and North America.

References

Further reading

External links

 

Anthicidae
Articles created by Qbugbot
Beetles described in 1824